Angenstein Castle ( or simply Angenstein) is a castle in the municipality of Duggingen in the canton of Basel-Land in Switzerland. It is a Swiss heritage site of national significance.

The Jura Railway passes through a tunnel under Angenstein Castle on its route between Basel and Delémont.

A Scoutsgroup and few other organisations and companies are named after the castle.

See also
 List of castles in Switzerland

References

External links
 

Cultural property of national significance in Basel-Landschaft
Castles in Basel-Landschaft